James Chappell may refer to:
 James Chappell (astronomer)
 James Chappell (servant)
 Jimmy Chappell, ice hockey player
 Jim Chappell, American pianist
 Jim Chappell (businessman), American restaurateur